The economy of Belfast, Northern Ireland was initially built on trade through Belfast Harbour. Later, industry contributed to its growth, particularly shipbuilding and linen. At the beginning of the 20th century Belfast was both the largest producer of linen in the world
and also boasted the world's largest shipyard.
Civil unrest impacted the city's industry for many years, but with the republican and loyalist ceasefires of the mid-1990s, Good Friday Agreement and the St Andrews Agreement in 2006, the city's economy has seen some resurgence once again.

History of the economy
When the population of Belfast town began to grow in the 17th century, its economy was built on commerce. It provided a market for the surrounding countryside and the natural inlet of Belfast Lough gave the city its own port. The port supplied an avenue for trade with Great Britain and later Europe and North America. In the mid-seventeenth century, Belfast exported beef, butter, hides, tallow and corn and it imported coal, cloth, wine, brandy, paper, timber and tobacco. Around this time, the linen trade in Northern Ireland blossomed and by the middle of the eighteenth century, one fifth of all the linen exported from Ireland was shipped from Belfast. The present city however is a product of the Industrial Revolution. It was not until industry transformed the linen and shipbuilding trades that the economy and the population boomed. By the turn of the nineteenth century, Belfast had transformed into the largest linen producing centre in the world, earning the city and its hinterlands the nickname "Linenopolis" during the Victorian Era and into the early part of the 20th century.
100,000 people in the city, mainly women, were employed in its linen trade by the 1900s and 1910s, although shipbuilding had overtaken it to become the dominant industry since the 1870s.

Belfast harbour was dredged in 1845 to provide deeper berths for larger ships. Donegall Quay was built out into the river as the harbour was developed further and trade flourished. The Harland and Wolff shipbuilding firm was created in 1861 and by the time the Titanic was built in Belfast in 1912, they boasted the largest shipyard in the world.

The rise of mass-produced and cotton clothing following World War I were some of the factors which led to the decline of Belfast's international linen trade. Like many UK cities dependent on traditional heavy industry, Belfast suffered serious decline since the 1960s, exacerbated greatly in the 1970s and 1980s by the civil unrest of The Troubles. More than 100,000 manufacturing jobs have been lost since the 1970s. For several decades, Northern Ireland's fragile economy required significant public support from the British exchequer of up to £4 billion per year. Ongoing sectarian violence made it difficult for Belfast to compete with Ireland's Celtic Tiger economy, with Dublin producing some 70bn Euro GDP annually.

Current economy
The IRA Ceasefire in 1994 and the signing of the Good Friday Agreement in 1998 gave investors increased confidence to invest in Belfast. This led to a period of sustained economic growth and large-scale redevelopment of the city centre. New developments included Victoria Square, the Cathedral Quarter, and the Laganside with the new Odyssey complex and the Waterfront Hall. 
Two other major developments included the Titanic Quarter regeneration, and the erection of the Obel Tower. In 2007, Belfast launched its vision for a World Trade Centre (currently a 'virtual' centre but with plans to become a physical building) which ostensibly aimed to promote the city to the international business market.

As of 2017, Belfast is Northern Ireland's educational and commercial hub. As of 2007, it was in the top five fastest growing regional economies in the UK. In February 2006, Belfast's unemployment rate stood at 4.2%, lower than both the Northern Ireland and the UK average of 5.5%. Over the past 10 years employment has grown by 16.4 per cent, compared with 9.2 per cent for the UK as a whole.

Northern Ireland's peace dividend has also led to soaring property prices in the city. In 2006, Belfast saw house prices grow by 43%, the fastest rate of growth in the UK. In March 2007, the average house in Belfast cost £191,819, with the average in South Belfast being £241,000. In 2004, Belfast had the lowest owner occupation rate in Northern Ireland at 54%.

Peace has also boosted the numbers of tourists coming to Belfast. There were 6.4 million visitors in 2005, which was a growth of 8.5% from 2004. The visitors spent £285.2 million, supporting over 15,600 jobs. The city's two airports have also made the city into one of the most visited weekend destinations in Europe.

The 32 Vestas V164 8MW wind turbines for the 256 MW Burbo Bank Offshore Wind Farm extension are to be assembled in Belfast.

Due to the ongoing COVID-19 Pandemic, the economy of Belfast has experienced a decline, according to PricewaterhouseCoopers.

See also
 Economy of Northern Ireland
 Belfast
 Belfast City Centre
 Dublin-Belfast corridor
 Economy of Cork
 Economy of Dublin
 Economy of Limerick

References

Further reading 
 

 
History of Belfast
Belfast